The Osage Indian murders were a series of murders of Osage Native Americans in Osage County, Oklahoma, during the 1910s–1930s; newspapers described the increasing number of unsolved murders as the Reign of Terror, lasting from 1921 to 1926. Some sixty or more wealthy, full-blood Osage Native Americans were reported killed from 1918 to 1931. However, newer investigations indicate that other suspicious deaths during this time could have been misreported or covered up murders, including people who were heirs to future fortunes.

Some of the murders were committed  for the purposes of taking over land and wealth of Osage members, whose land was producing valuable oil and who each had headrights that earned lucrative annual royalties. Investigation by law enforcement, including the Bureau of Investigation (BOI; the preceding agency to the Federal Bureau of Investigation, or FBI) also revealed extensive corruption among local officials involved in the Osage guardian program. Most of the murders were never prosecuted, but some men were convicted and sentenced including William Hale, who ordered the murders of his nephew's wife and other members of her family, to gain control of their oil rights.

The United States Congress changed the law to prohibit non-Osage from inheriting headrights from Osage with half or more Native American ancestry. The U.S. government continued to manage the leases and royalties from oil-producing lands, and the tribe became concerned about these assets. In 2000, the Osage Nation filed a suit against the Department of the Interior, alleging that it had not adequately managed the assets and paid people the royalties they were due. The suit was settled in 2011 for $380 million and commitments to improve program management.

Background
In 1897, oil was discovered on the Osage Indian Reservation, or present-day Osage County, Oklahoma. The U.S. Department of the Interior managed leases for oil exploration and production on land owned by the Osage Nation through the Bureau of Indian Affairs and later managed royalties, paying individual allottees. As part of the process of preparing Oklahoma for statehood, the federal government allotted  to each Osage on the tribal rolls in 1907; thereafter, they and their legal heirs, whether Osage or not, had "headrights" to royalties in oil production, based on their allotments of lands. The headrights could be inherited by legal heirs, including non-Osage. The tribe held the mineral rights communally and paid its members by a percentage related to their holdings.

By 1920, the market for oil had grown dramatically and brought much wealth to the Osage. In 1923 alone "the tribe took in more than thirty million dollars, the equivalent today of more than four hundred million dollars." People across the U.S. read about the Osage, called "the richest nation, clan or social group of any race on earth, including the whites, man for man." Some Osage used their royalties to send their children to private schools; others bought fancy cars, clothes and jewelry, and traveled in Europe; and newspapers across the country covered their activities. Along with tens of thousands of oil workers, the oil boom attracted many white opportunists to Osage County; as the writer Robert Allen Warrior characterizes them, some were entrepreneurial, while others were criminal, seeking to separate the Osage from their wealth by murder if necessary.

Believing the Osage would not be able to manage their new wealth, or lobbied by whites who wanted a piece of the action, the United States Congress passed a law in 1921 which required that courts appoint guardians for each Osage of half-blood or more in ancestry, who would manage their royalties and financial affairs until they demonstrated "competency". Under the system, even minors who had less than half-Osage blood had to have guardians appointed, regardless of whether the minors had living parents. The courts appointed the guardians from local white lawyers or businessmen. The incentives for criminality were overwhelming; such guardians often maneuvered legally to steal Osage land, their headrights or royalties; others were suspected of murdering their charges to gain the headrights.

At that time, eight lawyers were working in Pawhuska, the Osage County seat, which had 8,000 residents; the number of lawyers was said to be as great as Oklahoma City, which had 140,000 residents. In 1924, the Department of the Interior charged two dozen guardians of Osage with corruption in the administration of their duties related to their charges, but all avoided punishment by settling out of court. These guardians were believed to have swindled their charges out of millions of dollars. In 1929, $27 million was reported as still being held by the "Guardian System", the organization set up to protect the financial interests of 883 Osage families in Osage County.

Murders in Osage County
In the early 1920s, the western U.S. was shaken by the reported murders of eighteen Osage and three non-natives in Osage County within a short period of time. Colorado newspapers reported the murders as the "Reign of Terror" on the Osage reservation. Some murders seemed associated with several members of one family.

On May 27, 1921, local hunters discovered the decomposing body of 36-year-old Anna Brown in a remote ravine of Osage County. Unable to find the killer, local authorities ruled her death as accidental because of alcohol poisoning and put the case aside. Brown was divorced, so probate awarded her estate to her mother, Lizzie Q. Kyle. Kelsie Morrison, a petty criminal, later admitted to murdering Brown and testified that William Hale, a prominent local cattleman, had asked him to do so. Along with his admission, Morrison implicated Hale's nephew and Brown's ex-boyfriend, Bryan Burkhart, in her murder. Morrison testified that, after meeting Brown earlier at her sister Mollie's home, he and Burkhart took a heavily intoxicated Brown to Three Mile Creek, where Morrison shot and killed her.

The body of another Osage, Brown's cousin Charles Whitehorn (also known as Charles Williamson), was discovered near Pawhuska on the same day as hers; Whitehorn had been shot to death. Two months later, Lizzie Q. Kyle was killed as well. By that time, Lizzie had headrights for herself and had inherited the headrights from her late husband and two daughters. Her heirs became fabulously wealthy.

On February 6, 1923, Henry Roan, another cousin of Brown's (also known as Henry Roan Horse), was found in his car on the Osage Reservation, dead from a shot in the head. Roan also had a financial connection with Hale, having borrowed $1,200 from the cattleman. Hale fraudulently arranged to make himself the beneficiary of Roan's $25,000 life insurance policy. Over a month later, on March 10, 1923, a bomb destroyed the Fairfax residence of Anna's sister Rita Smith, killing Rita and her servant, Nettie Brookshire. Rita's husband, Bill Smith, sustained massive injuries from the blast and died four days later. Shortly before his death, Bill gave a statement implicating his suspected murderers and appointed his wife's estate. Later investigations revealed that the bomb contained  of nitroglycerin.

On June 28, 1923, Hale and Burkhart put George Bigheart on a train to Oklahoma City to be taken to a hospital. There, doctors suspected that he had ingested poisoned whiskey. Bigheart called attorney William "W.W." Watkins Vaughan of Pawhuska, asking him to come to the hospital as soon as possible for an urgent meeting. Vaughan complied, and the two men met that night. Bigheart had said he had suspicions about who was behind the murders and had access to incriminating documents that would prove his claims. Vaughan boarded a train that night to return to Pawhuska, but turned up missing the next morning when the Pullman porter went to awaken him; his berth on the train had not been used. Vaughan's body was later found with his skull crushed beside the railroad tracks near Pershing, about five miles south of Pawhuska. Bigheart died at the hospital that same morning.

Thirteen other deaths of full-blooded Osage men and women, who had guardians appointed by the courts, were reported between 1921 and 1923. By 1925, at least sixty wealthy Osage had died and their land had been inherited or deeded to their guardians, who were local white lawyers and businessmen. The Bureau of Investigation (BOI), the preceding agency to the Federal Bureau of Investigation (FBI), found a low-level market in contract killers to kill the Osage for their wealth. In 1995, the writer Robert Allen Warrior wrote about walking through an Osage cemetery and seeing "the inordinate number of young people who died during that time."

In 1925, Osage tribal elders, with the help of local law officer James Monroe Pyle, sought assistance from the BOI when local and state officials could not solve the rising number of murders. Pyle presented his evidence of murder and conspiracy and requested an investigation. The BOI sent Tom White to lead an investigation. Because of the large number of leads and the perception that the police were corrupt, White decided he would be the public face of the investigation while most of the agents would work undercover. The other agents recruited were: a former New Mexico sheriff; a former Texas Ranger; John Burger, who had worked on the previous investigation; Frank Smith; and John Wren, an American Indian of the Ute Nation who had previously been a spy for the Mexican revolutionaries.

Investigation
The Osage Tribal Council suspected that Hale was responsible for many of the deaths. The Commissioner of Indian Affairs in the Department of the Interior sent four agents to act as undercover investigators. Working for two years, the agents discovered a crime ring led by Hale, known in Osage County as the "King of the Osage Hills". Hale and his nephews, Ernest and Bryan Burkhart, had migrated from Texas to Osage County to find jobs in the oil fields. Once there, they discovered the immense wealth of members of the Osage Nation from royalties being paid from leases on oil-producing lands. Hale's goal was to gain the headrights and wealth of several tribe members, including his nephew's Osage wife, the last survivor of her family.

To gain part of the wealth, Hale persuaded Ernest to marry Mollie Kyle, a full-blooded Osage. Hale then arranged for the murders of Mollie's sisters, her brother-in-law, her mother, and her cousin, Henry Roan, to cash in on the insurance policies and headrights of each family member. Other witnesses and participants were murdered as investigation of the conspiracy expanded. Mollie and Ernest Burkhart inherited all of the headrights from her family. Investigators soon discovered that Mollie was already being poisoned.

Charges and trials
Hale, his nephews, and one of the ranch hands they hired were charged with the murder of Mollie Kyle's family. Hale was formally charged with the murder of Roan, who had been killed on the Osage Reservation land, making it a federal crime. Two of his accomplices had died before the BOI investigation was completed. Hale and his associates were convicted in state and federal trials from 1926 to 1929, which had changes of venue, hung juries, appeals, and overturned verdicts. In 1926, Ernest pleaded guilty to being part of the conspiracy.

John Ramsey confessed to participation in the murder of Roan as soon as he was arrested. He said that Hale had promised him five hundred dollars and a new car for killing Roan. Ramsey met Roan on a road outside of Fairfax, and they drank whiskey together. Then Ramsey shot Roan in the head. Subsequently, Ramsey changed his story, claiming that the actual killer was Curly Johnson. His accomplice, Bryan Burkhart, another nephew, had turned state's evidence. The trials received national newspaper and magazine coverage. Sentenced to life imprisonment, Hale, Ramsey, and Ernest Burkhart later received parole despite protests from the Osage.

Various residents of Pawhuska petitioned Oklahoma Governor Jack C. Walton to conduct a full investigation of the deaths of Charles Bigheart and his attorney, William Vaughan. Walton assigned Herman Fox Davis to the investigation. Shortly after the assignment, Davis was convicted of bribery. Although Walton later pardoned Davis, the investigation of Bigheart and Vaughan was never completed.

In the case of the Smith murders, Ernest was soon convinced that even his wife's money and his uncle's political influence could not save him. He changed his plea to guilty and asked to be sentenced to life imprisonment rather than receive the death penalty. He turned state's evidence, naming his uncle as responsible for the murder conspiracy. Ernest said that he had used a person named Henry Grammer as a go-between to hire a professional criminal named Asa "Ace" Kirby to perform the killings. Both Grammer and Kirby were killed before they could testify. Ernest Burkhart's attempt to kill his wife failed. Mollie, a devout Catholic, had told her priest that she feared she was being poisoned at home. The priest told her not to touch liquor under any circumstances. He also alerted one of the FBI agents. Mollie recovered from the poison she had already consumed and (after the trials) divorced Ernest. Mollie Burkhart Cobb died of unrelated causes on June 16, 1937. Her children inherited all of her estate.

In the early 1990s, journalist Dennis McAuliffe of The Washington Post investigated the suspicious death of his grandmother, Sybil Beekman Bolton, an Osage with headrights who died in 1925 at age 21. As a youth he had been told she died of kidney disease, then as a suicide. His doubts arose from a variety of conflicting evidence. In his investigation, McAuliffe found that the BOI believed that the murders of several Osage women "had been committed or ordered by their husbands." Most murders of the Osage during the early 1920s went unsolved. McAuliffe found that when Bolton was a minor, the court had appointed her white stepfather, attorney Arthur "A.T." Woodward, as her guardian. Woodward also served as the federally appointed Tribal Counsel, and he had guardianship of four other Osage charges, each of whom had died by 1923. McAuliffe learned that his grandmother's murder had been covered up by a false death certificate. He came to believe that Woodward was responsible for her death. His book about his investigation, Bloodland: A Family Story of Oil, Greed and Murder on the Osage Reservation (1994), presents an account of the corruption and murders during this period.

Osage County officials sought revenge against Pyle for his role in bringing the murders to light. Fearing for his life, Pyle and his wife fled to Arizona, where he again served as an officer of the law. He died there in 1942.

Change in law
To try to prevent further criminality and to protect the Osage, in 1925 Congress passed a law prohibiting non-Osage from inheriting headrights from Osage who had half or more Native American ancestry.

Trust management lawsuit
The Department of Interior continued to manage the trust lands and pay fees to Osage with headrights. In 2000, the tribe filed a lawsuit against the department, alleging that federal government management of the trust assets had resulted in historical losses to its trust funds and interest income. This was after a major class-action suit had been filed against the departments of Interior and Treasury in 1996 by Elouise Cobell (Blackfeet) on behalf of other Native Americans, for similar reasons.

In 2011, the U.S. government settled with the Osage for $380 million. The settlement also strengthened management of the tribe's trust assets and improved communications between the Department of Interior and the tribe. The law firm representing the Osage said it was the largest trust settlement with one tribe in U.S. history.

In literature and media

 John Joseph Mathews (Osage) based his novel Sundown (1934) in the period of the murders.
 "The Osage Indian Murders", a dramatization of the case first broadcast on August 3, 1935, was the third episode of the radio series G-Men, created and produced by Phillips Lord with cooperation of the FBI. G-Men lasted 13 episodes before leaving the air in October 1935. A retooled version, Gang Busters, which dramatized cases from a number of different American law enforcement agencies rather than just the FBI, debuted the following January.
 Award-winning western novelist Fred Grove, part Osage on his mother's side, was 10 years old when he was an "ear" witness to the bombing murders of Bill and Rita Smith and Nettie Brookshire. This incident haunted him. Several of his novels were based on aspects of the case: his first novel, Flame of the Osage (1958), two written in roughly the middle of his career: Warrior Road (1974) and Drums Without Warriors (1976), and one of his last, The Years of Fear (2002). 
 The Kyle family murders were featured as a dramatic part of the 1959 film, The FBI Story.
 John Hunt portrayed this period in his novel The Grey Horse Legacy (1968).
 Linda Hogan's Mean Spirit (1990) explores a fictionalized version of the murders.
 Tom Holm's novel The Osage Rose (2008) is a fictionalized account of murders on Osage Territory intended to strip Osage members of their royalties and land.
 American journalist David Grann investigates the case in his 2017 book Killers of the Flower Moon: The Osage Murders and the Birth of the FBI. The book is the basis for Martin Scorsese's next film of the same name starring Robert De Niro, Jesse Plemons, Tantoo Cardinal, and Leonardo DiCaprio

See also
Osage Nation#Natural resources and headrights

Notes

References

Further reading 

 Bill Burchardt, "Osage Oil," The Chronicles of Oklahoma 41 (Fall 1963)

External links
All FREE videos about The Osage Indian Murders found at The Internet Archive (a non-profit corporation)
"Osage Indian Murders", FBI, scanned images of original casenotes, more than 3,000 pages
Osage Reign of Terror. Encyclopedia of the American Indian in the Twentieth Century

1921 murders in the United States
1931 murders in the United States
1910s murders in the United States
1920s murders in the United States
1930s murders in the United States
American frontier
Anti-indigenous racism in the United States
Crimes in Oklahoma
Indigenous peoples of the Great Plains
Murder in Oklahoma
Murdered Native American people
Native American history of Oklahoma
Osage Nation
History of the petroleum industry in the United States
Petroleum in Oklahoma
Serial murders in the United States
Violence against indigenous peoples